Hilton (Scottish Gaelic: Baile A' Chnuic) is a former village now part of the city of Inverness, in the Highland council area of Scotland. It is about 2 km south of the city centre. A large amount of council housing was built there during the post-war era of the 20th century. As implied by both names, it is on a slight elevation between the River Ness and the valley of the Mill Burn.

Schools

There are two primary schools, Hilton and Cauldeen. After pupils finish their 7th year of education they mostly go to the Inverness Royal Academy, although they have the option of attending other schools, at the discretion of the local authority's Education Department.

Services in the area

In Hilton there are three local shops, a bar/restaurant, a hairdressers', a nail bar, a butchers', 2 churches, a chip shop, a pharmacy, a Domino’s and 2 cafes.

Transport

On weekdays there are buses into the centre of Inverness every 20 minutes from early morning until late evening, with a less frequent service at weekends. The buses tend to never show up when needed

References

Areas of Inverness